Richard Parkinson Waite (born 11 June 1980) is an English cricketer.  Waite is a right-handed batsman who bowls right-arm off break.  He was born in Stockton-on-Tees, County Durham.

Waite represented the Durham Cricket Board in 10  List A matches against Buckinghamshire in the 2nd round of the 2002 Cheltenham & Gloucester Trophy which was played in 2001 and against Glamorgan in the 2003 Cheltenham & Gloucester Trophy.  In his 10 List A matches, he scored 350 runs at a batting averageof 45.23 with high score of 89*.  In the field he took a single catch.  With the ball he took 4 wickets at a bowling average of 18.50, with best figures of 2/25.

In 2004, he joined Cumberland, making his Minor Counties Championship debut for the county against Cambridgeshire.  From 2004 to 2006, he represented the county in 12 Championship matches, the last of which came against Bedfordshire.  Waite also played a number of MCCA Knockout Trophy matches for the county.

For the 2010 season, Waite represented Northumberland, playing 2 Minor Counties Championship matches against Bedfordshire and Suffolk.  His debut in the MCCA Knockout Trophy came against Staffordshire.  He played 3 further Trophy matches for the county in 2010.
He is currently part of the coaching team for Hong Kong Ladies Cricket Team

References

External links
Richard Waite at Cricinfo
Richard Waite at CricketArchive

1980 births
Living people
Cricketers from Stockton-on-Tees
English cricketers
Durham Cricket Board cricketers
Cumberland cricketers
Northumberland cricketers
Cricketers from Yorkshire